Mompha subbistrigella, the garden cosmet, is a moth of the Momphidae family found in most of Europe.

Description
The wingspan is 7–11.5 mm. Adults are on wing from late summer to late spring.

The larvae feed within the seedpods of broad-leaved willowherb (Epilobium montanum) and occasionally on other willowherb (Epilobium species).

References

Momphidae
Moths described in 1828
Moths of Europe
Taxa named by Adrian Hardy Haworth